Denbigh Baptist Christian School is a private Christian school in Newport News, Virginia that provides education to students from preschool through twelfth grade.

References

External links
 Official site

Baptist schools in the United States
Christian schools in Virginia
High schools in Newport News, Virginia
Schools in Newport News, Virginia
Private K-12 schools in Virginia